Battlegroup I-2010 or BG I-2010 is an EU Battlegroup led by Poland (therefore also known as the Polish-led Battlegroup), in which Germany, Lithuania, Latvia and Slovakia also participate. It was on standby during the first half of 2010.

References 

Battlegroups of the European Union
Germany–Poland military relations
Germany–Latvia military relations
Germany–Lithuania military relations